Blackhawk is an unincorporated community in Pierson Township, Vigo County, in the U.S. state of Indiana. The nearest official town is Riley. Blackhawk has one listing on the National Register of Historic Places in Vigo County, the Frank Senour Round Barn, built in 1905.

History
A post office was established at Blackhawk in 1901, and remained in operation until it was discontinued in 1927.

Geography

References

Unincorporated communities in Indiana
Unincorporated communities in Vigo County, Indiana
Terre Haute metropolitan area